Hanser García Hernández (born 10 October 1988 in Caibarién, Cuba) is a Cuban whose original sport was water polo but later on became a swimmer and freestyle specialist. He competed in the 50 m event and the 100 m event at the 2012 Summer Olympics and placed 23rd and 7th respectively. At the 2011 Pan American Games, García won the silver medal in the 100m freestyle and the bronze in the 50m freestyle.

References

External links

1988 births
Living people
Cuban male freestyle swimmers
Swimmers at the 2012 Summer Olympics
Olympic swimmers of Cuba
People from Caibarién
Swimmers at the 2011 Pan American Games
Pan American Games silver medalists for Cuba
Pan American Games medalists in swimming
Central American and Caribbean Games medalists in swimming
Central American and Caribbean Games gold medalists for Cuba
Competitors at the 2014 Central American and Caribbean Games
Medalists at the 2011 Pan American Games
21st-century Cuban people